Abdullah Gaith (28 January 1930 – 12 March 1993) was an actor from Egypt. He was the younger brother of actor Hamdi Gaith, who died in 2006.

Abdullah Gaith was born in a village called Kafr Al-Shalshalmoon in the province of Sharqia Governorate, Egypt. He studied theatre at the High Institute of Theatrical Arts.

Among his theatrical works are: Al-Husain as a Rebel (Al-Husain Tha'eran- in Arabic), Mahran the Youth (Al Fata Mahran), and The Visit of the Aging Woman (Ziarat Al-Sayyidah Al-Ajuz).

Among his numerous works in TV : Sukun Al-Asifah (The Calm of the Storm) (1978), Ibn Taimeyyah (1984), Musa ibn Nusayr (the great Arab Muslim ruler of Africa who managed the conquest of Spain), Abu Zaid Al-Hilali (1979), Antarah (1979), Al-Sindibad (1985), and Al-Kitabah Ala Lahmin Yahtariq (Writing on Burning Flesh) (1986).

Ghaith's most famous work in cinema is Mohammad, Messenger of God (U.S. title: The Message) (1976) which narrates the story of the rise of Islam.

Later life and death
Abdullah Gaith died on 12 March 1993 of cancer.

Filmography

References 

1930 births
1993 deaths
Egyptian male film actors
20th-century Egyptian male actors
Deaths from cancer in Egypt